The 1978–79 Texas Longhorns men's basketball team represented the University of Texas at Austin in the 1978–79 NCAA Division I men's basketball season as a member of the Southwest Conference. They finished the season 21-8 overall, tied for the SWC regular season title with a 13–3 record and reached the NCAA tournament. They were coached by Abe Lemons in his third season as head coach of the Longhorns. They played their home games at the Special Events Center in Austin, Texas.

Roster

Schedule

|-
!colspan=12 style=| Regular season

|-
!colspan=9 style=|SWC tournament

|-
!colspan=9 style=|NCAA tournament

Rankings

References

Texas Longhorns men's basketball seasons
Texas
Texas